Tibor Varga (born 31 May 1985) is a Slovak professional ice hockey player. He is currently a free agent.

Career 
Varga previously played with HC Slovan Bratislava in the Slovak Extraliga, Bakersfield Condors of the ECHL, and the Huntsville Havoc and Mississippi Riverkings of the Southern Professional Hockey League.

Career statistics

Regular season and playoffs

References

External links
 

1985 births
Living people
Slovak ice hockey left wingers
Bakersfield Condors (1998–2015) players
BK Havlíčkův Brod players
Bratislava Capitals players
HC Košice players
HC Slovan Bratislava players
HK Dukla Trenčín players
HK 91 Senica players
HK Trnava players
Huntsville Havoc players
MHC Martin players
Mississippi RiverKings (SPHL) players
MsHK Žilina players
HC Nové Zámky players
Ice hockey people from Bratislava
Slovak expatriate ice hockey players in the United States
Slovak expatriate ice hockey players in the Czech Republic